Md Faridul Haq Khan is a Bangladesh Awami League politician and the incumbent state minister of religious affairs as well as member of parliament for Jamalpur-2.

Early life
Khan was born on 2 January 1956 in Uttar Shirajbad, Islampur, Jamalpur District, East Pakistan, Pakistan. He studied up to high school, completing his HSC.

Career
Khan was elected to parliament from Jamalpur-2 as a candidate of Bangladesh Awami League. He beat Sultan Mahmud Babu, the candidate of Bangladesh Nationalist Party, to win the election. On 24 November 2020 he takes oath as state minister for religious affairs.

References

Awami League politicians
Living people
9th Jatiya Sangsad members
1956 births
10th Jatiya Sangsad members
11th Jatiya Sangsad members
State Ministers of Religious Affairs (Bangladesh)